The Sedgley OSS .38 glove pistol or Sedgley Fist Gun is a World War II firearm. It was designed by Stanley M. Haight and manufactured by Sedgley Co. of Philadelphia for the U.S. Marines and the U.S. Navy. Its official designation by the US Navy was Hand Firing Mechanism, Mk 2.

Description
The Sedgley OSS is a single-shot, break-action, smoothbore .38 Special pistol which was designed by Stanley M. Haight for the Naval Intelligence Office. It was meant as a covert operation and assassination weapon in the Pacific Theater. It was mounted on the back of a cowhide glove; the gun would be usually worn along with a long-sleeved coat to hide the weapon until it was used. Due to its appearance, it was commonly nicknamed "Glove Pistol" or "Glove Gun".

The trigger is a bar parallel to and extending past the barrel. After being loaded and cocked, the weapon is fired by the shooter making a fist and pressing the trigger against the target's body. Between 52 and 200 are believed to have been manufactured. Each Sedgley was issued only as one glove and not as a pair.

In fiction and popular culture 
The Sedgley OSS is seen in the Quentin Tarantino World War II alternate history film Inglourious Basterds. The film centers on elements of the First Special Service Force operating under orders from the OSS dropping behind German lines to conduct a political assassination of Nazi high-command. Two Sedgley OSS weapons are utilized near the film's climax, including one loaded, concealed, and used by a character played by the actor Eli Roth and another used without concealment.

See also
Apache revolver
Protector Palm Pistol

References

External links
 "Weird Weapon with a Hollywood Connection"  The National WW2 Museum, New Orleans website: (with picture).
 "United States Patent 2,423,448"

Single-shot pistols
World War II firearms of the United States